Schinia cardui is a moth of the family Noctuidae. It is found in southern and south-eastern Europe.

The larvae feed on Picris hieracioides.

External links
Fauna Europaea
Image from France
Lepiforum.de

Schinia
Moths of Europe
Taxa named by Jacob Hübner
Moths described in 1790